USS Fitzgerald (DDG-62), named for United States Navy officer Lieutenant William Charles Fitzgerald, is an  in the US Navy.

In the early morning hours of 17 June 2017, the ship was involved in a collision with the container ship , seriously damaging the destroyer. Seven of her crew were killed. Several others were injured, including her commanding officer, Commander Bryce Benson.

Construction
Fitzgeralds keel was laid down by Bath Iron Works, Bath, Maine, 9 February 1993; launched 29 January 1994; sponsored by Betty A. Fitzgerald, widow of the late Lt. Fitzgerald; and commissioned 14 October 1995, in Newport, Rhode Island. The ship was then homeported in Naval Base San Diego, California.

Service history

In early April 2004, Navy officials announced plans to deploy Fitzgerald, 14 other destroyers, and three cruisers to counter ballistic missile threats worldwide. The next month, she took part in a personnel exchange known as "Super Swap", taking aboard 141 sailors from the destroyer  and transferring 95 to join the soon-to-be-decommissioned ship's decommissioning unit. Fitzgerald sailed to Yokosuka Naval Base in Yokosuka, Japan, arriving on 30 September 2004, and joining the U.S. 7th Fleet's Destroyer Squadron 15.

In March 2011, in company with the aircraft carrier , Fitzgerald was deployed off northeastern Honshu, Japan, to assist with relief efforts after the 2011 Tōhoku earthquake and tsunami.

On 16 November 2011, while docked in Manila, Philippines, Fitzgerald hosted US Secretary of State Hillary Clinton and Philippine Foreign Affairs Secretary Albert del Rosario to sign the Manila Declaration, which called for multilateral talks to resolve maritime disputes and to mark the 60th anniversary of the American–Philippine Mutual Defense Treaty.

On 1 June 2017, Fitzgerald, operating out of Yokosuka Naval Base, was noted for participating in routine exercises with Japan that were described in the media as a show of force to North Korea.

Fitzgerald participated in RIMPAC 2022.

2017 collision 

Most of Fitzgeralds crew of about 300 were asleep at the time.

The starboard side of Fitzgerald was seriously damaged. The container ship's bulbous bow penetrated the destroyer's hull below the waterline, flooding a machinery space, the radio room, and two crew berthing spaces. The captain's cabin was crushed. Seven crewmen were reported missing after the collision, but their bodies were found the next day after rescue workers gained access to flooded compartments. The injured include the ship's commanding officer and two sailors.

Within a day of the collision, investigations were begun by the United States Navy, U.S. Coast Guard, Japanese Coast Guard, Japan Transport Safety Board, and the insurers of the Crystal. The U.S. Navy's Manual of the Judge Advocate General (JAGMAN) investigation concerns the crew's operations, and is led by Rear Adm. Brian Fort, a former commander of USS Gonzalez, who now commands Navy Region Hawaii and Naval Surface Group Middle Pacific. The U.S. and Japanese coast guards are investigating the cause of the accident. Steffan Watkins, a Canada-based security analyst, created a Google Maps overlay for the broadcast AIS data points.

Including costs for planned service life extension and other upgrades, repairs for the damage to Fitzgerald are expected to run about $368.7 million, and will take over a year. Repairs on the ship will overlap with planned service life extension and electronics upgrade, but despite the need to replace portions of the ship's AEGIS system the ship will remain in "a legacy configuration instead of upgrading to Baseline 9".

On 17 August 2017, the two senior officers and the senior enlisted sailor in charge of the naval vessel were relieved of their duties.
The Navy planned to discipline up to a dozen sailors, including the commanding officer, for watchstanding failures that allowed the fatal collision.

In late August 2017, it was reported that the destroyer will be transported by the Dockwise heavy-lift ship MV Transshelf to Huntington Ingalls Industries’ shipyard in Pascagoula.

It was announced in October that the vessel would not be upgraded to the latest version of the Aegis system.

On 28 November 2017, the destroyer was further damaged by two punctures to her hull during the loading process to MV Transshelf, compelling her to return to Yokosuka for the punctures to be repaired.

Fitzgerald arrived at the Port of Pascagoula in Mississippi on 19 January 2018, aboard the heavy-lift transport MV Transshelf, after a two-month journey from Japan. She was expected to spend a few days in the port, being lifted off the transport and readied for her trip to the Huntington Ingalls Industries shipyard, where she was expected to commence an estimated two year repair.

In August 2019, the Japan Transport Safety Board's final report concluded distraction and incomplete radar information aboard the US Navy vessel caused the accident.

On 3 February 2020, USS Fitzgerald exited the Pascagoula shipyard for sea trials aimed at testing all shipboard systems.  Following these sea trials, Fitzgerald plans to return to the shipyard to correct any remaining issues and then commence crew training in preparation for its return to active duty. On 13 June 2020 she departed Pascagoula to return to her home port in San Diego.

Awards
 Captain Edward F. Ney Memorial Award for outstanding food service - (2012)
 Navy Unit Commendation - (16-20 Dec 1998)
 Navy Meritorious Unit Commendation - (Dec 2000-Mar 2001, Apr 2012-Dec 2013)
 Navy E Ribbon - (1997, 1998, 1999, 2007, 2008, 2009, 2011, 2013)
 Humanitarian Service Medal - (Mar-May 2011) 2011 Tōhoku earthquake and tsunami
 Spokane Trophy - (2000)
 Marjorie Sterrett Battleship Fund Award - (2007)

See also
 USS John S. McCain and Alnic MC collision

References

Notes

Sources

Further reading

External links

Official website

navsource.org: USS Fitzgerald

 

1994 ships
Arleigh Burke-class destroyers
Destroyers of the United States
Ships built in Bath, Maine
Maritime incidents in 2017